Regoul  is a small rural hamlet, located 4.5 miles south of Nairn, in Nairnshire, Scottish Highlands and is in the Scottish council area of Highland.

References
https://www.google.co.uk/maps/dir/Nairn/Regoul,+Nairn,+Highland+IV12,+UK/@57.5618045,-3.8826192,13z/data=!3m1!4b1!4m13!4m12!1m5!1m1!1s0x48857f60bce16edb:0x26f7d88216ab010e!2m2!1d-3.868475!2d57.586422!1m5!1m1!1s0x4885807e044cea97:0x579889ef53fc285a!2m2!1d-3.867742!2d57.536735?hl=en

Populated places in the County of Nairn